The Wheel of Ice is a 2012 original novel written by Stephen Baxter and based on the long-running British science fiction television series Doctor Who. It features the Second Doctor, Jamie and Zoe. It was released both as a standard edition hardback and an audio book read by David Troughton (son of Second Doctor actor Patrick Troughton).

External links

Review on The A.V. Club

2012 British novels
2012 science fiction novels
Second Doctor novels
Novels based on Doctor Who
Novels by Stephen Baxter
BBC Books books
Fiction set on Saturn